This is a summary of 1932 in music in the United Kingdom.

Events
7 October – The London Philharmonic Orchestra, recently founded by Thomas Beecham and Malcolm Sargent, gives its first public concert.
date unknown – Henry Hall becomes Director of the BBC Dance Orchestra.

Popular music
 "Ain't it grand to be blooming well dead?" w. Leslie Sarony
 "The Flies Crawled Up The Window" w.m. Douglas Furber & Vivian Ellis
 "Love Is The Sweetest Thing"     w.m. Ray Noble
 "Mad About the Boy"     w.m. Noël Coward
 "What More Can I Ask?"     w. A. E. Wilkins m. Ray Noble

Classical music: new works
Arnold Bax 
Concerto for Cello and Orchestra
Sinfonietta
Sonata No. 4, for piano
Summer Music, for orchestra (revised version)
Symphony No. 5
"Watching the Needleboats", for voice and piano (text by James Joyce)
Arthur Benjamin – Violin Concerto
Arthur Bliss – A Colour Symphony (revised)
Arnold Cooke – Harp Quintet
Gustav Holst
"If 'twer the Time of Lilies", for two-part choir and piano, H187 (words by Helen Waddell)
Jazz-Band Piece
Jig, for piano, H179
John Ireland – A Downland Suite
Cyril Rootham – Symphony No 1 in C minor  
Michael Tippett – String Trio in B Flat
Ralph Vaughan Williams – Magnificat for contralto, women's chorus, and orchestra
William Walton – 3 Songs to Poems by Edith Sitwell
Grace Williams 
Suite for orchestra
Two Psalms for contralto, harp and strings

Opera
Alfred Reynolds – Derby Day (with libretto by A. P. Herbert)

Film and Incidental music
John D. H. Greenwood – After Office Hours
Louis Levy – White Face

Musical theatre
16 September – Words and Music, a London revue by Noël Coward, opens at the Adelphi Theatre.

Musical films
Carmen, directed by Cecil Lewis, starring Marguerite Namara and Thomas F. Burke
For the Love of Mike, directed by Monty Banks, starring Bobby Howes, Constance Shotter and Arthur Riscoe
Goodnight, Vienna, directed by Herbert Wilcox, starring Jack Buchanan, Anna Neagle and Gina Malo
Little Waitress, directed by Widgey R. Newman, starring Claude Bailey and Moore Marriott 
The Maid of the Mountains, directed by Lupino Lane, starring Nancy Brown and Harry Welchman

Births
3 January – Johanna Peters, operatic mezzo-soprano (died 2000)
12 January – Des O'Connor, comedian, singer and television host (died 2020)
19 January – Russ Hamilton, English singer-songwriter (died 2008)
23 January – Cyril Davies, blues musician (died 1964)
29 January – Myer Fredman, British-Australian conductor (died 2014)
26 February – Jean Allister, opera singer (died 2012)
31 March – John Mitchinson, operatic tenor
19 May
John Barnes, saxophonist and clarinet player
Alma Cogan, singer (died 1966)
21 May – Robert Sherlaw Johnson, pianist and composer (died 2000)
27 June – Hugh Wood, composer
16 July – John Chilton, jazz trumpeter (died 2016)
31 August – Roy Castle, actor, musician and singer (died 1994)
11 September – Ian Hamer, jazz trumpeter (died 2006)
18 September – Maureen Lehane, operatic mezzo-soprano (died 2010)
19 September – Lol Coxhill, jazz saxophonist (died 2012)
15 November – Petula Clark, singer, actress, and songwriter 
26 December – Clive Westlake, songwriter (died 2000)

Deaths
28 January – Poldowski, Belgian-born British pianist and composer, 52
3 March – Eugen d'Albert, Scottish-born German pianist and composer, 67
14 May – John Hughes, composer of Cwm Rhondda
22 July – Hugh Blair, organist and composer, 67
21 August – Frederick Corder, composer and music teacher, 80
21 September – William Herbert Scott, church composer and hymn-writer, 70 
23 November – Percy Pitt, organist and conductor, 62
4 December – Mona McBurney, pianist, teacher and composer, 70
10 December – Percy Fletcher, composer, 52

See also
 1932 in British television
 1932 in the United Kingdom
 List of British films of 1932

References

British Music, 1932 in
Music
British music by year
1930s in British music